Valentin Paret-Peintre (born 14 January 2001) is a French cyclist who currently rides for the AG2R Citroën U23 Team, the development team of UCI WorldTeam , which he will join full-time for the 2022 season. His brother Aurélien is also a professional cyclist.

Major results
2018
 2nd La Classique des Alpes Juniors
2019
 1st La Classique des Alpes Juniors
2020
 6th Overall Ronde de l'Isard
1st Stage 3
2021
 1st Overall 
 4th Paris–Tours Espoirs
 4th Giro del Belvedere

References

External links

2001 births
Living people
French male cyclists
People from Annemasse
Sportspeople from Haute-Savoie
Cyclists from Auvergne-Rhône-Alpes